Earth Trust Centre is the hub of the Earth Trust Farm at Little Wittenham, at the foot of Wittenham Clumps and includes: the main office; Earth Lab, where education activities take place; Innovation Hub, the newly refurbished barn which is available for corporate space hire; Fison Barn and courtyard, a beautiful venue available to hire for weddings, celebrations and corporate events; and Poem Tree Café, which is only open during Earth Trust's larger festivals and events.

During the week the office gardens are often being used by education groups; when not in use, please feel free to explore – we have a wild play area and sensory garden with ponds.

The car park is open during office hours for visitors to the Centre.

The Earth Trust Centre is open to school groups and the general public for special events.

External links
Earth Trust Centre

Nature centres in England
Education in Oxfordshire
Archaeological sites in Oxfordshire
Environment of Oxfordshire
Geology of Oxfordshire
Tourist attractions in Oxfordshire

References